The economy of the United Arab Emirates (or UAE) is the 5th largest in the Middle East (after Iran, Saudi Arabia, Turkey, and Israel), with a gross domestic product (GDP) of US$503 billion (AED 1.84 trillion) in 2022.

The UAE economy is heavily reliant on revenues from petroleum and natural gas, especially in Abu Dhabi. In 2009, more than 85% of the UAE's economy was based on the oil exports. In 2011, oil exports accounted for 77% of the UAE's state budget. In recent years, there has been some economic diversification, particularly in Dubai. Abu Dhabi and other UAE emirates have remained relatively conservative in their approach to diversification. Dubai has far smaller oil reserves than its counterparts.

Tourism is one of the bigger non-oil sources of revenue in the UAE. A massive construction boom, an expanding manufacturing base, and a thriving services sector are helping the UAE diversify its economy. Nationwide, there is currently $350 billion worth of active construction projects.

The UAE is a member of the World Trade Organization and OPEC.

Economic overview
UAE has the second-largest economy in the Arab world (after Saudi Arabia), with a gross domestic product (GDP) of US$414 billion (AED 1.52 trillion) in 2018. A third of the GDP is from oil revenues. The economy was expected to grow 4–4.5% in 2013, compared to 2.3–3.5% over the previous five years. Since independence in 1971, UAE's economy has grown by nearly 231 times to AED1.45 trillion in 2013. The non-oil trade has grown to AED1.2 trillion, a growth of around 28 times from 1981 to 2012.

The UAE's economy is one of the most open worldwide, and its economic history goes back to the times when ships sailed to India, along the Swahili coast, as far south as Mozambique.

International Monetary Fund (IMF) expected UAE's economic growth to increase to 4.5% in 2015, compared to 4.3% in 2014. The IMF ascribed UAE's potentially strong economic growth in World Economic Outlook Report to the increased contribution of non-petroleum sectors, which registered a growth average of more than 6% in 2014 and 2015. Such contribution includes banking, tourism, commerce and real estate. Increase of Emirati purchasing power and governmental expenditures in infrastructure projects have considerably increased.

Internationally, UAE is ranked among the top 20 for global service business, according to AT Kearney, the top 30 on the WEF "most-networked countries" and in the top quarter as a least corrupt country per the TI's corruption index.

The government of the United Arab Emirates announced a broad restructuring and merger of more than 50% of its federal agencies, including ministries and departments, in an attempt to deal with and recover from the economic shocks following months-long coronavirus lockdown.

Historical background 
Prior to independence from the United Kingdom and unification in 1971, each emirate was responsible for its own economy. At the time, pearl diving, seafaring and fishing were together the mainstay of the economy, until the development of Japanese cultured pearls and the discovery of commercial quantities of oil. Previous UAE President Zayed Bin Sultan Al Nahyan is credited with bringing the country forward into the 20th century and using the revenue from oil exports to fund all the necessary development. Likewise, former UAE vice-president Rashid Bin Saeed Al Maktoum had a bold vision for the Emirate of Dubai and foresaw the future in not petroleum alone, but also other industries.

In the 1980s Dubai's diversification centred around trade and the creation of shipping and logistics centres, notably Port Rashid and the port and Free Zone of Jebel Ali as well as Dubai International Airport, leading to a number of major global plays in shipping, transportation and logistics (DP World, Emirates, DNATA).

Recent history 
The emergence of Dubai's lively real estate market was briefly checked by the global financial crisis of 2007–8, when Dubai was bailed out by Abu Dhabi. The recovery from the overheated market led to tighter regulation and oversight and a more realistic market for real estate throughout the UAE with many 'on hold' projects restarting. Although the market continues to expand, current market conditions for developers have been characterised as 'tough'.

As a result of COVID-19 pandemic, the UAE’s economy shrank by 6.1% in 2020.  The country’s account balance dropped to six per cent of GDP in 2020 from 8.5 per cent in 2019 due to the underperformance of both hydrocarbon and non-hydrocarbon exports mitigated by lower imports.

In late 2021, it was announced that UAE’s banking assets are expected to grow by between 8 per cent and 10 per cent in 2022 as the second-biggest Arab economy continues to recover from the covid-19 pandemic. It was also announced the UAE’s economy might grow at a faster than projected rate, reaching 4.6% in 2022.

Data 
The following table shows the main economic indicators in 1980–2021 (with IMF staff estimtates in 2022–2027). Inflation below 5% is in green. The annual unemployment rate is extracted from the World Bank, although the International Monetary Fund find them unreliable.

External trade

With imports totaling $273.5 billion in 2012, UAE passed Saudi Arabia as the largest consumer market in the region. Exports totaled $314 billion, which makes UAE the second largest exporter in the region.

UAE and India are each other's main trading partners, with the latter having many of its citizens working and living in the former. The trade totals over $75 billion (AED275.25 billion).

The top five of the Main Partner Countries of the UAE in 2014 are Iran (3.0%), India (2.9%), Saudi Arabia (1.5%), Oman (1.4%) and Switzerland (1.2%). As for the top five of UAE suppliers are China (7.4%), United States (6.4%), India (5.8%), Germany (3.9%) and Japan (3.5%).

Diversification of UAE's economy

Although UAE has the most diversified economy in the GCC, the UAE's economy remains extremely reliant on oil. With the exception of Dubai, most of the UAE is dependent on oil revenues. Petroleum and natural gas continue to play a central role in the economy, especially in Abu Dhabi. More than 85% of the UAE's economy was based on the oil exports in 2009. While Abu Dhabi and other UAE emirates have remained relatively conservative in their approach to diversification, Dubai, which has far smaller oil reserves, was bolder in its diversification policy. In 2011, oil exports accounted for 77% of the UAE's state budget.

Dubai suffered from a significant economic crisis in 2007–2010 and was bailed out by Abu Dhabi's oil wealth. Dubai's current prosperity has been attributed to Abu Dhabi's petrodollars. In 2014, Dubai owed a total of $142 billion in debt. The UAE government has worked towards reducing the economy's dependence on oil exports by 2030. Various projects are underway to help achieve this, the most recent being the Khalifa Port, opened in the Emirate of Abu Dhabi at the end of 2012. The UAE has also won the right to host the World Expo 2020, which is believed to have a positive effect on future growth, although there are some skeptics which mention the opposite.

Over the decades, the Emirate of Dubai has started to look for additional sources of revenue. High-class tourism and international finance continue to be developed. In line with this initiative, the Dubai International Financial Centre was announced, offering 55.5% foreign ownership, no withholding tax, freehold land and office space and a tailor-made financial regulatory system with laws taken from best practice in other leading financial centers like New York, London, Zürich and Singapore. A new stock market for regional companies and other initiatives were announced in DIFC. Dubai has also developed Internet and Media free zones, offering 100% foreign ownership, no tax office space for the world's leading ICT and media companies, with the latest communications infrastructure to service them. Many of the world's leading companies have now set up branch offices, and even changed headquarters to, there. Recent liberalization in the property market allowing non citizens to buy freehold land has resulted in a major boom in the construction and real estate sectors, with several signature developments such as the 2 Palm Islands, the World (archipelago), Dubai Marina, Jumeirah Lake Towers, and a number of other developments, offering villas and high rise apartments and office space. Emirates (part of the Emirates Group) was formed by the Dubai Government in the 1980s and is presently one of the few airlines to witness strong levels of growth. Emirates is also the largest operator of the Airbus A380 aircraft. , budgeted government revenues were about AED 29.7 billion, and expenditures were about AED 22.9 billion. In addition, to finding new ways of sustaining the national economy, the UAE has also made progress in installing new, sustainable methods of generating electricity. This is evidenced by various solar energy initiatives at Masdar City and by other renewable energy developments in parts of the country.

In addition, the UAE is starting to see the emergence of local manufacturing as new source of economic development, examples of significant government-led investments such as Strata in aerospace industry, under Mubadala are successful, while there are also small scale entrepreneurial ventures picking up, such as Zarooq Motors in the automotive industry.
	
In August 2020, the Barakah nuclear power plant, the first nuclear power plant in the Arab world, became operational.

Foreign trade 

With reference to foreign trade, UAE's market is one of the world's most dynamic markets worldwide, placed among the 16 largest exporters and 20 largest importers of commodities. The top five of the Main Partner Countries of the UAE in 2014 are Iran (3.0%), India (2.9%), Saudi Arabia (1.5%), Oman (1.4%) and Switzerland (1.2%). As for the top five of UAE suppliers are China (7.4%), United States (6.4%), India (5.8%), Germany (3.9%) and Japan (3.5%).

In 2014, the United Arab Emirates managed to export 380.4bn dominated by four products which are Petroleum oils and oils obtained from bituminous... (19.8%) Diamonds, whether or not worked, but not mounted... (3.4%) Gold in UAE(3.2%) incl. gold plated with platinum, unwrought...Articles of jewellery and parts thereof, of...(2.8%). In the same year, the United Arab Emirates imported 298.6 bn dominated by five countries which are China (7.4%), United States (6.4%), India (5.8%), Germany (3.9%), Japan (3.5%).

On one hand, the United Arab Emirates managed in 2013 to export 17 bn USD services exported in 2013 dominated by travel (67.13%), transportation (28.13%), Government services (4.74%). On the other hand, it imported 63.9 bn USD of services imported services dominated by transportation (70.68%), travel (27.70%) and government services (1.62%).

In September 2021, the UAE announced its plans to aggravate its trade ties with other economies, particularly in Asia and Africa. The country indicated that it was looking for inward foreign investments of around $150 billion in the next nine years, that is, by 2030. The Emirates aimed to be one of the world’s ten biggest investment nations. However, it had to face strong competition from its neighbor, Saudi Arabia, creating a broader gap in the once-assumed alliance between the two countries. The Emirati minister of state for foreign trade said, “Let the Saudis increase the competition. It means the pie is going to be bigger and having a bigger pie means that the UAE share out of this pie is going to be bigger.”

Human Resources and Employment

Many buildings were was built primarily by workers from South Asia and East Asia. This is generally because the current generation of UAE locals prefer governmental jobs and not private sector employment. On 17 June 2008, there were about 7,500 skilled workers employed at the Burj Khalifa construction site. Press reports indicated in 2006 that skilled carpenters at the site earned £4.34 a day, and labourers earned £2.84. According to a BBC investigation and a Human Rights Watch report, the workers were housed in abysmal conditions, and worked long hours for low pay. During construction, only one construction-related death was reported. However, workplace injuries and fatalities in the UAE are "poorly documented", according to Human Rights Watch.

In March 2006 about 2,500 workers, upset over buses that were delayed for the end of their shifts, protested and triggered a riot, damaging cars, offices, computers and construction equipment. A Dubai Interior Ministry official said the rioters caused almost £500,000 in damage. Most of the workers involved in the riot returned the following day but refused to work. Workers at Dubai airport also protested.

Emiratisation 

Emiratisation is an initiative by the government of the UAE to employ more UAE Nationals in a meaningful and efficient manner in the public and private sectors. While the program has been in place for more than a decade and results can be seen in the public sector, the private sector is still lagging behind with citizens only representing 0.34% of the private sector workforce.

While there is general agreement over the importance of Emiratisation for social, economic and political reasons, there is also some contention as to the impact of localization on organizational efficiency. It is yet unknown whether, and the extent to which, employment of nationals generates returns for MNEs operating in the Middle East. Recent research cautions that localization is not always advantageous for firms operating in the region, and its effectiveness depends on a number of contingent factors.

In December 2009 however, a positive impact of UAE citizens in the workplace was identified in a newspaper article citing a yet unpublished study, this advantage being the use of networks within the evolving power structures.

Overall, however, uptake in the private sector remains low regardless of significant investments in education, which have reached record levels with education now accounting for 22.5% – or $2.6 billion – of the overall budget planned for 2010. Multiple governmental initiatives are actively promoting Emiratisation by training anyone from high school dropouts to graduates in a multitude of skills needed for the – essentially Western – work environment of the UAE, these initiatives include Tawteen UAE, ENDP or the Abu Dhabi Tawteen Council.

There are very few anti-discrimination laws in relation to labour issues, with Emiratis – and other GCC nationals – being given preference when it comes to employment. Unions are generally banned and workers with any labour issues are advised to be in touch with the Ministry of Labour, instead of protesting or refusing to work. Migrant employees often complain of poor workplace safety and wages based on nationality, although this is being slowly addressed.

Beyond directly sponsoring educational initiatives, the Emirates Foundation for Philanthropy is funding major research initiatives into Emiratisation through competitive research grants, allowing universities such as United Arab Emirates University or Dubai School of Government to build and disseminate expertise on the topic.

Academics working on various aspects of Emiratisation include Paul Dyer[12] and Natasha Ridge from Dubai School of Government, Ingo Forstenlechner[13] from United Arab Emirates University, Kasim Randaree from the British University of Dubai and Paul Knoglinger from the FHWien.

In 2020, economy of the United Arab Emirates became vulnerable to the COVID-19 pandemic, witnessing an economic shutdown. Among the Emirates, Dubai was facing extreme situation, where the expat workers were left jobless. Thousands of the Britons working in the city started selling off their possessions to collect money, as the strict visa regulations forced them to return to the UK.

According to an April 2021 report published by the Democracy Centre for Transparency on the Discrimination against foreigners and expatriates living in the UAE versus Emirati citizens, despite labor reforms in the UAE, foreigners and skilled or unskilled migrant workers face discrimination and racialization from the citizens of the country. Foreigners and expatriates are often subjected to discrimination at work concerning promotions and wages, or gender inequality. The findings of the DCT concern the organization as the UAE’s economy largely relies on foreign workers and thus fulfills a crucial international role. The organization demands that the UAE abide by universal human rights principles.

The 31st edition of World Report 2021 released by Human Rights Watch reiterates that labour abuses driven by an exploitative kafala system are persistent in the UAE. During the Covid-19 pandemic, migrant workers faced massive unemployment issues and were also left stranded in dire conditions without legal residencies. Also, many migrants suffered wage theft and were unable to pay rent or buy food.

Investment
The stock market capitalization of listed companies in the UAE was valued at $109.9 billion in October 2012 by Bloomberg.

Outward investment 
A investment institutions were created by the government to promote manage investments made by the UAE abroad:

Abu Dhabi Investment Authority (ADIA)
 Abu Dhabi Investment Council (ADIC)
 Mubadala Development Company (MDC)
 International Petroleum Investment Company (IPIC)
 Dubai World
 Dubai International Capital (DIC)

Inward investment 
The UAE is in the 17th position in term of the Global Competitiveness Index (GCI). The report says that the UAE competitiveness stems from "high quality [...] infrastructure" and "highly efficient good markets."

Corporate Governance Code
The Securities and Commodities Authority (SCA) introduced a new corporate governance regulation (the Corporate Governance Code), which applies to all joint stock companies and institutions whose securities are listed on Dubai Financial Market (DFM) and Abu Dhabi Securities Exchange (ADX) in 2009.

Banking
On 19 June 2020, rating agency Moody's changed its outlook regarding eight banks in the United Arab Emirates from stable to negative. The change was due to “the potential material weakening in their standalone credit profiles”, where the UAE's economy was facing additional challenges amidst the COVID-19 pandemic and low oil prices. The eight banks included Abu Dhabi Commercial Bank, Emirates NBD, HSBC Bank Middle East, Dubai Islamic Bank, Abu Dhabi Islamic Bank, National Bank of Fujairah, National Bank of Ras al-Khaimah and Mashreq Bank.

The Fitch Ratings in its June 22, 2020 report predicted that the Standalone Credit Profiles of UAE-based banks are to possibly weaken in the following year owing to the financial crisis caused by the coronavirus pandemic and oil price collapse. As per the Fitch report, despite the implementation of timely measures for supporting the economy, the profitability of banks in the UAE are prone to get affected by a lower non-interest income worsened by a controlled business volume, lower interest rates, and higher loan recovery charges. In addition, the asset quality is expected to weaken, too, following the unbearable impact of the economic downturn that all borrowers may not be able to withstand.

Real estate 

The development in the real estate and infrastructure sectors during the recent year has contributed in making the country a global touristic destination. The contribution of tourism in the Emirati GDP increased from 3% in the mid-1990s to more than 16.5% by the end of 2010. This trend is supported by the huge public investments in touristic projects (47 Billion Dollars per annum) carried mainly to expend airports, increase their capacity, set up new airports and ports.

The real estate sector have a positive impact on development, job opportunities, investments and tourism as estate projects were launched to meet the needs of market and the increasing demand for housing and commercial units especially in Dubai and Abu Dhabi. The UAE has 18 tour hotels out of the 155 (150 meters high) that exist around the world. This makes the UAE the third destination with such tours after China and the United States in 2014. These buildings are among the UAE's attractions for tourists. Dubai has adopted dazzling ideas in construction and design of these tall tours.

The leap in real estate sector along and infrastructure development in the UAE during the recent year has contributed in making this country a global touristic destination par excellence. Therefore, the contribution of tourism in the Emirati GDP increased from 3% in the mid-1990s to more than 16.5% by the end of 2010. This trend is supported by the huge public investments in touristic projects (47 Billion Dollars per year) carried mainly to expend airports, increase their capacity, set up new airports and ports.

The UAE has about 37% of the region's petroleum and gas industries, chemical industries, energy and water and garbage projects. The UAE's government have been injecting huge funds in tourism and real estate projects, especially in Abu Dhabi and Dubai. Al Saadiyat Island in Abu Dhabi and Burj Khalifa in Dubai, the tallest tower in the world, world central near “Jebel Ali” are a point in case of the milestones that have given the UAE its high profile of a global tourist destination. According to 2013–2014 Global Competitiveness Report, the UAE ranked fourth worldwide in terms of infrastructure quality.

On 28 November 2020, the Abu Dhabi Media Office announced that the government of United Arab Emirates, ahead of the 49th National Day, granted house loans, land and homes worth $2 billion (7.2 billion dirhams) to their citizens. The package is said to consist 3,099 plots, 2,000 house loans and 601 homes and exempting some families of the deceased citizens and retirees from the repayment of mortgage. The Director General of the Abu Dhabi Housing Society, Basheer Al Mehairbi said the initiative of providing sustainable housing aimed at ensuring a good standard of living for the citizens of the UAE.

Real-estate projects
Some of the significant real-estate projects are:

 Burj Khalifa
 Creek Tower
 Arabian Ranches
 Mohammed bin Rashid City
 Falcon City of Wonders
 International City
 Dubai Marina
 Jumeirah Beach Residence
 Jumerah Lakes Towers (JLT)
 Al Barari Dubai
 Business Bay
 Dubai Hills
 Dubai South
 City Walk
 Al Furjan
 Dubai Sports City
 Dubai Motor City
 Saadiyat Island
 The World, the Palms and the Palm (artificial islands)
 Dubai Miracle Garden, the world's largest natural flower garden.
 Masdar City, a zero carbon, zero waste city.
 Yas Island, in Abu Dhabi, featuring attractions such as Ferrari World,
 Yas Marina
 Maryam Island in Sharjah
 Falcon Island, in Ras Al Khaimah
 Al Dana Island, artificial Fujairah island

Financial centers 
Among the most prominent financial centers in the UAE are:
 Dubai International Financial Center (DIFC), a Dubai-based federal financial free zone
 Abu Dhabi Global Market (ADGM), an international financial centre located on Al Maryah Island

See also
 Ministry of Finance (United Arab Emirates)
 Economy of Dubai
 National Bonds Corporation PJSC
 List of Free Trade Zones in UAE
 List of largest companies of the United Arab Emirates
 Human rights in the United Arab Emirates
 Israel–United Arab Emirates peace agreement

Notes

References

External links
 UAE Economy on the CIA World Factbook
 
 Gulf Resources United Arab Emirates
 World Bank Summary Trade Statistics United Arab Emirates

 
United Arab Emirates
Economy of the Arab League
United Arab Emirates
Petroleum industry in the United Arab Emirates